Kevin Ehlers (born 23 January 2001) is a German professional footballer who plays as a centre-back for 2. Bundesliga club Dynamo Dresden.

Career
Ehlers made his professional debut for Dynamo Dresden in the 2. Bundesliga on 27 July 2019, starting in the home match against 1. FC Nürnberg which finished as a 1–0 loss.

Personal life
Ehlers was born in Munich, Bavaria, and is the son of former Bundesliga footballer Uwe Ehlers.

Honours
Individual
Fritz Walter Medal U19 Silver: 2020

References

External links
 
 

2001 births
Living people
German footballers
Footballers from Munich
Association football central defenders
Germany youth international footballers
2. Bundesliga players
3. Liga players
Dynamo Dresden players